Medway River is a river in Queens County, on the southwestern shore of Nova Scotia, Canada. At 121 kilometres long, it is one of the major rivers of Nova Scotia and once supported a large run of Atlantic salmon. Historically, it was an important corridor to the interior waters of Nova Scotia such as Ponhook and Molega Lakes and as a log-driving river for the lumber industry.

Together with Herring Cove and related smaller inlets, the drainage basin of the Medway is measured at 2,012 km2 including 166 km2 of water.

See also
List of rivers of Nova Scotia

References

Rivers of Nova Scotia